Bráulio Mantovani (born July 1963 in São Paulo) is a Brazilian screenwriter and author.

Graduating in Portuguese Language and Literature from the Pontifícia Universidade Católica de São Paulo, he began his career writing professionally for theatre groups in 1987. In the early 1990s, he moved to New York City where he worked as camera operator and assistant director for Zbigniew Rybczyński.

Back in Brazil, he wrote the script for the short film Palace II, directed by Fernando Meirelles in 2001. On the next year, the partnership extended to City of God, which earned him an Academy Award nomination for Best Adapted Screenplay.

Awards and Recognitions
2003 Academy Awards — Nominated for Best Adapted Screenplay for City of God
2011 São Paulo Prize for Literature — Shortlisted in the Best Book of the Year - Debut Author category for Perácio - Relato Psicótico

Filmography
Tropa de Elite 2 (2010)
Linha de Passe (2008)
Tropa de Elite (2007) 
O Ano em Que Meus Pais Saíram de Férias (2006) 
Nanoilusão (2005) 
Cidade dos Homens (2003) (TV series)
Cidade de Deus (2002) 
Palace II (2002)

References

External links
 

1963 births
Living people
Brazilian screenwriters